Nazer and Manzur is a poem written by Safavid era Persian poet Vahshi Bafqi, notable for featuring a romantic relationship between two men. Nazer is son of the Vizier who falls in love with Manzur, the King's son.

Notes

LGBT poetry
16th-century poems
Persian poems
LGBT in Iran
LGBT short stories